Alfonso Abraham Sánchez Anaya (born 23 January 1941) is a Mexican politician affiliated with the PRD. As of 2013 he served as Senator of the LX and LXI Legislatures of the Mexican Congress representing Tlaxcala. He also served as Deputy between 1994 and 1997 before becoming Governor of Tlaxcala in 1999, a post he held until 2004.

References

   
   

1941 births
Living people
Politicians from Tlaxcala
Members of the Senate of the Republic (Mexico)
Members of the Chamber of Deputies (Mexico)
Party of the Democratic Revolution politicians
Mexican veterinarians
Male veterinarians
21st-century Mexican politicians
National Autonomous University of Mexico alumni
Governors of Tlaxcala
20th-century Mexican politicians
People from Apizaco